XXXTentacion was an American rapper and singer who released four studio albums (two of which were posthumous releases), one compilation album (which was released posthumously), two mixtapes, four collaborative mixtapes (one of which was a posthumous release), seven extended plays and 29 singles (including eight as a featured artist). As of June 2018, he sold more than 25 million album-equivalent units in the United States. XXXTentacion was awarded for sales of over 20 million records by the Recording Industry Association of America (RIAA). As of October 2020, he has sold more than 60 million records in the United States.

XXXTentacion released his first track "News/Flock" in June 2013 on SoundCloud. His first official mixtape XXX (Unmastered) was released on March 5, 2014, but many tracks were later deleted and some have yet to be discovered. Ice Hotel is the first project that was made available to the public. He released various mixtapes and EPs throughout 2015 and 2016. He would release multiple EPs during this time, including "ItWillAllBeOverSoon" and "Red Light District" but were later soon deleted and scrapped, with select songs from the scrapped EPs appearing in later projects. In December 2015, XXXTentacion released his breakthrough single "Look at Me!", which received millions of plays on SoundCloud before being re-released through Empire Distribution in February 2017. The single peaked at number 34 on the Billboard Hot 100. It was later certified Platinum by the RIAA. In May of the same year, he released his first commercial mixtape Revenge, which peaked at number 28 on the Billboard 200.

His debut studio album "17" was released on August 25, 2017, and debuted at number two on the Billboard 200. The album spawned three singles: the gold-certified "Revenge" and the 8× Platinum "Jocelyn Flores" and 9× platinum "Fuck Love". In December 2017, he released his seventh EP A Ghetto Christmas Carol. His second studio album ? was released in March 2018 and debuted at number one on the Billboard 200. The album spawned three singles: "Sad!", certified Diamond, "Changes" and "Moonlight", certified 3× Platinum and 6× Platinum, respectively, by the RIAA. Members Only, Vol. 4 came out on January 23, 2019, the date which would have been his 21st birthday.
On December 15, 2022, near the anniversary of the original SoundCloud release, "WitDemDicks!" has been re-released to all streaming services.

Albums

Studio albums

Compilation albums

Mixtapes

Collaborative mixtapes and album

Extended plays

Singles

As lead artist

As featured artist

Other charted and certified songs

Guest appearances

Music videos

As lead artist

As featured artist

Notes

References

discography
Discographies of American artists